(translating to "tomato mush") is a thick Tuscan bread soup typically prepared with fresh tomatoes, bread, olive oil, garlic, basil, and various other fresh ingredients. It is usually made with stale or leftover bread, and can be served hot, room temperature, or chilled. 

The dish has ancient origins, although it was largely popularized by the 1911 publication of Il Giornalino di Gian Burrasca and by its television version, in which Rita Pavone sang the well-known song "Viva la pappa col pomodoro".

See also
 List of Italian soups
 List of tomato dishes
List of bread dishes
Pap (food)

References

External links

 

Cuisine of Tuscany
Italian soups
Tomato dishes
Articles containing video clips
Bread soups